Colin "Collie" Moran (born 6 June 1980) is a former Gaelic footballer who played for the Dublin county team. He was captain of the Leinster Senior Football Championship-winning Dublin teams in 2006 and 2007.

Playing career
Moran made his senior inter-county debut in October 1998. He plays his club football for Ballyboden St Enda's. Moran broke his arm in a 2004 challenge match against Limerick in between two Championship games. Moran was on the winning side for Leinster against Ulster in the 2005 Railway Cup and repeated the feat, as captain, against Connacht in 2006 in Canton, Boston. He also represented Ireland in the International Rules Series against Australia.

Moran retired on 22 April 2009 as a result of a hip injury.

Branding
OPEL Ireland recruited Moran as a brand ambassador for the company. An integral part of Moran's role to promote the car giant's support of GAA players in Ireland. He began his role as Opel ambassador with his participation in the GPA-endorsed Gaelic Performance Summer Camp in Gormanston in the summer of 2006.

He has appeared on TV3's Ireland AM offering sports commentary and reviews, and is also a regular contributor to RTÉ Radio 1's Drivetime Sport show, hosted by Des Cahill.

References

1980 births
Living people
Ballyboden St Enda's Gaelic footballers
Dublin inter-county Gaelic footballers
Gaelic football backs